Athletics at the 2017 Canada Summer Games were in Winnipeg, Manitoba at the University Stadium at the University of Manitoba. It was held from the July 31-August 4. There were 54 events of athletics.

Results

Male

100m

100m Special Olympics

200m

200m Special Olympics

400m

800m

1500m

5000m

110m hurdles

400m hurdles

3000m Steeplechase

200m Wheelchair

400m Wheelchair

1500m Wheelchair

4x100m Relay

4x400m Relay

High jump

Long jump

Triple jump

Pole vault

Shot Put

Discus

Discus Para

Javelin

Hammer

Decathlon

Female

100m

100m Special Olympics

200m

200m Special Olympics

400m

800m

1500m

5000m

100m Hurdles

400m Hurdles

3000m Steeplechase

200m Wheelchair

400m Wheelchair

1500m Wheelchair

4x100m Relay

4x400m Relay

High Jump

Long Jump

Triple Jump

Pole vault

Shot Put

Shot Put Para

Discus

Discus Para

Javelin

Hammer

Heptathlon

References

Athletics
Canada Games
2017